The 2021 Kosovar Supercup was the 30th edition of the Kosovar Supercup, an annual football match played between the winners of the previous season's Kosovo Superleague and Kosovar Cup competitions. The match was played between Prishtina, champions of the 2020–21 Kosovo Superleague and Llapi, who beat their opponents to win the 2020–21 Kosovar Cup Final.

Llapi won the match 3–1 and claimed their first Supercup title. Also this match was the inaugural match of the VAR system in Kosovar football.

Match

Details

See also
2020–21 Football Superleague of Kosovo
2020–21 Kosovar Cup

References

Kosovar Supercup
Supercup